Piñero Peak is the highest point of Piñero Island in Laubeuf Fjord, west Graham Land. Named after the island by the United Kingdom Antarctic Place-Names Committee in 1980.

References

Mountains of Graham Land
Fallières Coast